Derek Potteiger (born 6 January 1980 in the United States) is an American retired soccer player.

References

Association football midfielders
American soccer players
Living people
1980 births